"Ghost Bitch" is the debut single released by Japanese rock band, The Teenage Kissers. The single was originally released in a special 3-track EP February 20, 2013 and was distributed only at live shows. On June 16, 2013 "Ghost Bitch" was re-released in digital single format through the Media Factory music label. A music video for the song was featured on the DVD edition of Perfectly Dirty. The song "Violent Lips" was used in a commercial for the EP which appeared on MTV Japan. The song "I Love You and Kiss Me" was later released as a single and appeared on the band's first full album, Virgin Field.

Track list

References

External links
 The Teenage Kissers Official Site

2013 singles
Nana Kitade songs
Songs written by Nana Kitade
2013 songs